Kitai Bona Bona Island is an island in the Louisiade Archipelago, off the east coast of Basilaki Island, Milne Bay Province, Papua New Guinea.

Administration 
The island is part of Bedauna Ward which belongs to Bwanabwana Rural Local Level Government Area LLG, Samarai-Murua District, which are in Milne Bay Province.

Geography 
Kitai Bona Bona is part of the Kitai Islands, itself a part of Samarai Islands of the Louisiade Archipelago. 
It is located between Kitai Bai Island and the village of Agarauna on Basilaki Island.

References

Islands of Milne Bay Province
Louisiade Archipelago